The Nepal Baptist Church Council  is a Baptist Christian denomination in Nepal. It is affiliated with the Baptist World Alliance. The headquarters is in Kathmandu.

History
The Nepal Baptist Church Council has its origins in a British mission of the BMS World Mission and the Council of Baptist Churches in Northeast India in 1962.   It is officially founded in 1992.  According to a denomination census released in 2020, it claimed 246 churches and 20,971 members.

References

External links
 Official Website

Baptist denominations in Asia
Evangelicalism in Nepal